The Sacred Fount is a novel by Henry James, first published in 1901. This strange, often baffling book concerns an unnamed narrator who attempts to discover the truth about the love lives of his fellow guests at a weekend party in the English countryside. He spurns the "detective and keyhole" methods as ignoble, and instead tries to decipher these relationships purely from the behavior and appearance of each guest. He expends huge resources of energy and ingenuity on his theories, much to the bemusement of some people at the party.

Plot summary 

As he waits for the train to take him to a weekend party in the country, the narrator notices that Gilbert Long seems much more assured and lively than before. He also sees that Mrs. Brissenden (nicknamed "Mrs. Briss") is much younger-looking than her husband, though she's actually ten years older. The narrator begins to theorize that Long and Mrs. Briss are getting their vitality, vampire-like, from the "sacred fount" of their sexual partners' energy. At first, the narrator theorizes that the source of Long's newfound assurance and intelligence is a certain Lady John.

Later he changes his mind, as he constantly discusses his ideas with others at the party, particularly an artist, Ford Obert. The narrator notices that another woman at the party, May Server, seems listless, and he starts to wonder if she may be the lover providing vitality to Long. Eventually, the narrator begins to construct enormously elaborate theories of who is taking vitality from whom, and whether some people are acting as screens for the real lovers. In a long midnight confrontation with Mrs. Briss which concludes the novel, she says the narrator's theories are ridiculous, and he has completely misread the actual relationships of their fellow guests. She finishes by telling him he's crazy, and that last word leaves the narrator dismayed and overwhelmed.

Key themes 

While the narrator is often exasperating about his rather prurient interest in his fellow guests' sex lives, he does seem similar to other central characters in James' fiction who try to discover the truth from often misleading bits of information. But after a while, the narrator's theories begin to drive everybody, including the reader, a little nuts, as those theories constantly shift and grow incredibly complex.

Therefore, when Mrs. Briss dismisses the narrator as crazy, she might gain some sympathy from many readers. Of course, it's possible that Mrs. Briss is only trying to fool the narrator to conceal her own love affairs. Nothing is certain in this novel of shifting appearances and endless theories, with no final revelation of the truth.

The Sacred Fount has been seen as everything from a serious discussion of the "vampire" theory of human sexuality to a parody/treatment of the artist's construction of an alternative and more profound reality. But many have expressed simple bewilderment over what, if anything, James was trying to accomplish in the novel. James himself said that the book was "calculated to minister to curiosity," but many have maintained that the novel does little or nothing to reward that curiosity.

Criticism
Early critics treated the novel with blank incomprehension or near-contempt. Rebecca West issued one her wittiest sneers when she wrote: the narrator "spends more intellectual force than Kant can have used on The Critique of Pure Reason in an unsuccessful attempt to discover whether there exists between certain of his fellow-guests a relationship not more interesting among these vacuous people than it is among sparrows."

With that devastating dismissal ringing down through the decades, The Sacred Fount has not enjoyed a good press. Many critics have thrown up their hands over what one early reviewer called a "brilliantly stupid piece of work."  James himself omitted the book from the New York Edition (1907–1909) of his fiction, one of the very few later novels not to make the grade. Indeed, in a letter, dated March 15, 1901, to Mrs Humphry Ward, James declared: "I say it in all sincerity – the book isn't worth discussing [...] I hatingly finished it; trying to make it – the one thing it 'could' be – a 'consistent' joke." (The other exclusion among the later novels was The Other House (1896). The Outcry (1910) was published too late to make the edition.)

Ezra Pound, in his 1934 book ABC of Reading highly praised the novel, saying: "When you have read James' prefaces and twenty of his novels, you would do well to read The Sacred Fount. There for perhaps the first time since 1300 a writer has been able to deal with a sort of content wherewith Cavalcanti had been 'concerned'.

But as time has passed, and more peculiar works of art have gained acceptance, some critics have started to praise The Sacred Fount as a parable of how people shape appearances into an explanation of an impossibly complex world.  The book's preoccupation with the "vampire" theory, though, has continued to evoke occasional ridicule and little serious interest.

The critical literature on the book keeps piling up due to the novel's mystery and lack of a final resolution, and connections have been made to other works by James, particularly The Turn of the Screw and In the Cage, which also feature unnamed and imaginative protagonists.

The critic Ray Carney has judged it to be one of the "hardest" novels ever written.

In popular culture
In Chapter 21 of Donna Leon's third Guido Brunetti detective novel, Dressed for Death (1994; aka The Anonymous Venetian), Paola tells Guido, "I'm reading the master. The Sacred Fount is wonderful. Nothing happens, absolutely nothing." Later in the conversation, she states: "I'm already eager to finish it so that I can begin it all over again immediately."

References

Bibliography
 Introduction to The Sacred Fount by Leon Edel (New York: Grove Press, Inc. 1979) 
 The Novels of Henry James by Edward Wagenknecht (New York: Frederick Ungar Publishing Co., 1983) 
 A Henry James Encyclopedia by Robert Gale (New York: Greenwood Press, 1989)

External links
 Original book text of The Sacred Fount (1901)
 

1901 American novels
Novels by Henry James
Methuen Publishing books